Primula tetrandra, synonyms Dodecatheon tetrandrum and Dodecatheon alpinum, is a perennial plant in the primrose family, Primulaceae, known by the common name alpine shooting star.

This wildflower is native to the Western United States, in California, Arizona, Nevada, Oregon, Utah and Washington. The plant grows in wet areas in the mountains, such as in the Sierra Nevada and Transverse Ranges.

Description
Primula tetrandra is partially aquatic, sometimes growing along the edges of bogs and in shallow, slow rivulets. This is a thick-rooted perennial with narrow, straight leaves around the base.

It erects slim, tall stems which are dark in color and are topped with inflorescences of one or more showy flowers. Each flower nods with its mouth pointed to the ground when new, and becomes more erect with age. It has four reflexed sepals in shades of bright pink or lavender which lie back against the body of the flower. These may have bases of white or yellow which rim the corolla. From the corolla mouth protrude large black anthers and a thready stigma.

It flowers from June to August.

References

External links
Jepson Manual Treatment — Dodecatheon alpinum
USDA Plants Profile
Dodecatheon alpinum — U.C. Photo gallery

tetrandra
Flora of California
Flora of Arizona
Flora of Nevada
Flora of Oregon
Flora of Utah
Flora of the Cascade Range
Flora of the Great Basin
Flora of the Klamath Mountains
Flora of the Sierra Nevada (United States)
Natural history of the California Coast Ranges
Plants described in 1895
Flora without expected TNC conservation status